is a city located in Yamaguchi Prefecture, Japan.

History 

Iwakuni was formerly the castle town of the Iwakuni han, which was formed by Lord Hiroie Kikkawa after he was banished there for supporting the defeated shōgun. The Kikkawa clan ruled the han during the Edo period. The han was originally assessed at 30 thousand koku, and later, 60 thousand. Iwakuni han prospered for 300 years up until the Meiji Restoration. Before being re-founded with the same name following the mergers in 2006, the city was first founded on April 1, 1940.

On March 20, 2006, Iwakuni absorbed the towns of Kuga, Mikawa, Miwa, Nishiki, Shūtō and Yū, and the village of Hongō (all from Kuga District) to create the new and expanded city of Iwakuni.

Geography 
Located at 34° N, 132° E, Iwakuni is in the eastern part of Yamaguchi Prefecture, bordering the Seto Inland Sea.

Climate
Iwakuni has a humid subtropical climate (Köppen climate classification Cfa) with hot summers and cool winters. Precipitation is significant throughout the year, but is much higher from March to October, which encompasses the monsoon season from June to July, as well as peak typhoon season in September.

Demographics 
As of August 1, 2016, the city has an estimated population of 137,128 (which the city has decreased in population by 50,000 over the last 25 years) and a population density of 156.95 of persons per km2. The total area is 873.72 km2.

Industries 
Iwakuni is part of the Seto Inland Sea industrial area.  Petroleum is a major industry with Nippon Oil's Marifu refinery producing . Pulp is also produced in Nippon Paper's Iwakuni mill using a relatively new process called “methane fermentation treatment” which requires almost no energy. Other main industries include fibers and spinning, petrochemicals, and paper. The renkon (lotus root) is the principal agricultural product and is cultivated in the Hasuda field which is in the Ozu area, located near Minami Iwakuni station.

Transportation

Railway
Shin-Iwakuni Station on the Sanyo Shinkansen provides access to high-speed rail transportation.

Iwakuni Station on the Sanyo Main Line is about 45 minutes from Hiroshima Station, and is in the center of the city. Other stations on that line are Minami Iwakuni, Fuju, and Tsuzu. The JR Gantoku Line links Iwakuni Station to Tokuyama (since 2003 merged into Shunan) and points beyond, and serves Nishi Iwakuni, Kawanishi and Hashirano stations within the Iwakuni.

The Nishikigawa Railway Seiryu Line has six stations in Iwakuni, including Kawanishi Station.

Highway
The Sanyo Highway carries automobile traffic to and from Iwakuni. National highways 2, 187, 188 and 189 bring local traffic to nearby cities.

Airport
A civilian passenger terminal was built at Marine Corps Air Station Iwakuni and completed in 2012. Scheduled daily commercial flights to Tokyo started December 13, 2012.

Education 
The city of Iwakuni has 39 elementary schools, 19 junior high schools, and nine high schools. One high school, Iwakuni-Kogyo, is the alma mater of Shinji Mori who was a Major League Baseball player with the Tampa Bay Rays in 2005. He was part of the 1993 graduating class. Iwakuni also has two vocational schools, a junior college, and no universities.

Sports
Iwakuni is home to Hiroshima Toyo Carp's minor league team.

Sightseeing 
Tourists from both Japan and overseas who visit Hiroshima and Miyajima often extend their travels to include Iwakuni.

Kintai Bridge 

The famous Kintai Bridge (Kintai-kyō) is the city's most popular sightseeing spot. The Kintai Bridge spans the Nishiki River and was first constructed in 1673 by Hiroyoshi Kikkawa.  The bridge stood until September 14, 1950 when it was destroyed by the typhoon “Kijiya”. The bridge began being rebuilt only a week later and was completed in 1953. It was a recreation of the original and was built using traditional techniques. Since the first reconstruction, the Kintai Bridge has undergone some renovation. The latest renovation was completed in 2004. Its five arches are a symbol of western Honshū. The Kintai Bridge is about 20 minutes from Iwakuni Station by bus and about 15 minutes from Shin-Iwakuni Station of Sanyo-Shinkansen. Several buses provide service from Iwakuni and Shin-Iwakuni Station to the Kintai Bridge every day.

Kikko Park 
Kikko Park is located on the other side of the Kintai Bridge. This area used to be the residence of the Kikkawa family. The park has a big fountain and contains numerous shops as well as a variety of flowers.  Kikko Park is also home to a sanctuary for white snakes. These snakes are found only in Iwakuni, and have been designated as special national treasures by the Japanese government. The white snake is a symbol of Benten, the Japanese goddess of wealth. The white snake is considered a sign of good luck in Japan. Many people come to pray to the snakes so that they might be successful in their businesses.

Imazu White Snake Museum 
In Japanese folklore, if a white snake is found in your home it is said to bring good fortune. The white snakes found in Iwakuni are usually the albino variety of the Japanese Rat Snake. They are gentle ivory white snakes with ruby colored eyes which can only be found in concentration at Iwakuni. There is a viewing facility near Kikko Park.

Iwakuni Castle 
Iwakuni Castle (Momoyama Nanban-zukuri), as well as the preserved temples and buildings at the foot of the hill, provide a glimpse into old Japan. The castle was originally constructed in 1608 by Hiroie Kikkawa, but was destroyed only seven years later. It was reconstructed in 1962. Iwakuni Castle is situated at the top of Mount Shiroyama, and can be reached on foot or by cable car. The castle includes a history museum containing armor, weapons, and other artifacts of the Kikkawa family. From atop of the castle, there is an impressive view of Iwakuni. The castle area also offers several trails for hiking and exercise.

Cormorant fishing 
On the Nishiki river, traditional cormorant fishing can be seen in the summertime. Fishermen wearing traditional clothing such as the noble's headgear called “kazaore eboshi”, aprons, straw skirts, and straw sandals, perform this more-than-300-year-old fishing technique. The fishermen control the cormorant, making them catch a fish, which is then retrieved from the cormorant's mouth by the fisherman. Also, in early spring, the sight of cherry blossoms along the Nishiki river is unforgettable.

Other places 
The Mekata Residence was the home of a mid-ranking Samurai family from the 18th century. It is one of the last few remaining and so it is considered national property.

The Momijidani Maple Park used to be the garden of a temple. Located near the beginning of a mountain trail, many visitors come each autumn to view the colorful leaves on the many maple trees here.

The Nagayamon Gate of the Kagawa Family Residence is another well preserved piece of history. The appearance of this samurai residence has also been well kept and is considered prefectural cultural property.

In addition to the artifacts in Iwakuni Castle, more of the Kikkawa family's things are displayed at the Kikkawa Museum.

The Iwakuni Art Museum contains ceramics, armor, furniture, and other artifacts which were once used by feudal lords.

Iwakuni also offers several different kinds of plants and trees which people like to view. In addition to the cherry trees and maple trees along the Nishiki river, there are also Japanese apricot trees, peony bushes, azalea, Japanese iris, and hydrangea. Many of these plants and trees are located around Kikko Park.

Festivals 
The Kintai Bridge Festival is held annually on April 29 at Kikko Park. The festival includes a parade across the bridge called the “Sankin-koutai” Feudal Lords’ Procession featuring locals dressed in historic samurai costumes. The date of this festival is subject to some controversy as it is former emperor Hirohito's birthday. From the death of Hirohito in 1989 until 2005, the day was officially called “Greenery Day”.  In 2005, it was voted to change the name to “Showa Day” in reference to Hirohito despite the fear of opposition from other countries such as China and North Korea and South Korea, against which alleged war crimes were committed under the direction of the late emperor. However, according to the Liberal Democratic Party, this day would “encourage public reflection of the turbulent 63 years of Hirohito's reign, rather than glorify the emperor himself”.

The Nishiki River Water Festival is held on the first Saturday of every August. There is a large fireworks display and many people attend dressed in traditional clothing such as kimono.

Cuisine 
Visitors to Iwakuni may also wish to sample the town's special local version of sushi, which is made in a square mold. What is unique about this sushi is that it is prepared in large amounts, generally enough to feed about 150 people. There are also many "sushi-go-rounds" where sushi makes its way around the restaurant for patrons to pick and choose from via a moving belt.

Iwakuni is famous for fresh lotus roots which many people enjoy. Lotus roots grown in Iwakuni typically have nine holes, as opposed to lotus roots grown elsewhere, which typically have eight holes. These are cooked in different ways such as sautéed, simmered, or deep-fried.

Iwakuni  is a tea-flavored rice porridge originally created about 400 years ago by Hiroie Kikkawa as an inexpensive means of providing food for his subordinates. The tea which was originally used to flavor the chagayu is called “bancha”. Although a simple dish, this food has a long history in Iwakuni.

Ohira is a dish with simmered vegetables as well as wild plants and chicken.

Restaurants 
There is a restaurant in downtown Iwakuni called the "Osho", or the Gyoza House. It offers many local and traditional dishes such as ebichiri, which means "spicy shrimp", and the featured dish gyoza. There are many other restaurants that attract non-locals to the city. One is San Zoku, or Mountain Clan, known colloquially by Americans as The Chicken Shack because of its many chicken dishes. San Zoku is also known for a wonderful koi (carp) pond.

Other products 
The Ishi ningyo is a hand-made stone doll which is made from the nests of an insect called “ningyoutobikera” which are found in the rivers in Iwakuni. The dolls have been said to be the incarnations of the souls of ones who died during the construction of the Kintai bridge. People buy these dolls as souvenirs.

Kikkougama Iwakuni-yaki is ceramic ware that was used during the time of the Iwakuni han about 300 years ago that is still produced today. It is noted for its elegance and warm texture.

Military aviation 

There has been a military airfield at Iwakuni since the 1930s. The area was all farmland and villages until the Japanese government bought a large portion of it in 1938, with the view of establishing a naval air station. The new base was officially commissioned on July 8, 1940. When World War II started, the Iwakuni air station was used as a training and defense base. The station housed 96 trainers and 150 Zero fighter planes on the airstrip. In September 1943, a branch of the Etajima Naval Academy was established here, with approximately 1,000 cadets undergoing training in the Basic, Junior and Senior Officer's schools at any one time.
After World War II, the base was occupied by units of the Royal Australian Air Force as part of the British Commonwealth Occupation Force in Japan.

Then in 1952, the base officially became an air station of the United States Marine Corps. Marine Corps Air Station (MCAS) Iwakuni is also shared with the Japanese Maritime Self Defense Force. MCAS Iwakuni has an air station that many people in Iwakuni want to be made into a public international airport. However, as of 2009, it is only authorized for military use.

Iwakuni is the only US Marine Corps base on Honshu, the main island of Japan. Iwakuni is home to approximately half of the 1st Marine Aircraft Wing headquartered on Okinawa, elements of the 3rd Marine Logistics Group, and Fleet Air Wing 31 of the Japan Maritime Self Defense Force, according to the command website. In 2017, the base is home to about 15,000 U.S. military and Japanese defense force employees.

In 2014, it was planned to move the U.S. Carrier Air Wing from Naval Air Facility Atsugi to Iwakuni which will further increase the size of the base. The US Navy announced on Friday August 18, 2017 that the first jet squadrons from Carrier Air Wing (CVW) 5, nicknamed “the nation’s 911 air wing” will relocate to Marine Corps Air Station Iwakuni in the fall of 2017. CVW-5 is the US Navy's only forward-deployed carrier strike group.

Sister cities 
 Tottori
 Jundiaí, Brazil
 Taicang, China
 Everett, Washington United States

Notable people 
Naoto Tajima, who won gold in the triple jump (setting a new world record in that event), and bronze in the long jump, in the 1936 Summer Olympics in Berlin, was born in Iwakuni. Matthew Heafy, lead vocalist of American thrash metal/metalcore band Trivium, was born in Iwakuni in 1986.

Media

Newspaper
Yamaguchi Shimbun
Stars and Stripes (On-base)

TV
YAB TV (ANN)
KRY TV (NNN)
TYS TV (JNN)
NHK TV

Notes

External links

 Iwakuni City official website 
 Iwakuni City official website 
 Japanese National Tourist Organization Iwakuni page in English
 
 

Cities in Yamaguchi Prefecture
Port settlements in Japan
Populated coastal places in Japan